Lenin District is an administrative raion (district) of the city of Sevastopol. Population: 

It is the heart of Sevastopol and until 1961 was called Stalin Raion. The raion contains the city's central square - Nakhimov Square. In 1783 from here takes its origin the city of Sevastopol. The current borders of the raion were confirmed by the municipality in February 1977. To the west it borders Gagarin Raion, to the south - Balaklava Raion, to the east - Nakhimov Raion, and to the north its banks are washed by the waters of Sevastopol Bay. It is named after Vladimir Lenin.

References

Urban districts of Sevastopol
Soviet toponymy in Ukraine